The Heinkel HE 7 was a reconnaissance torpedo-bomber developed by the German aeronautical company Heinkel Flugzeugwerke in the late 1920s.

Design
The HE 7 was a low-wing monoplane with floats for sea operations. Because of restrictions imposed by the Versailles Treaty the aircraft did not enter production.

Specifications

References

External links
 Histaviation.com - Heinkel HE 7

HE 7
Single-engined tractor aircraft
Low-wing aircraft
Aircraft first flown in 1927